The Asko Concerto is a concerto for chamber orchestra by the American composer Elliott Carter.  The work was commissioned by the Dutch chamber group Asko Ensemble, for which the piece is titled.  It was composed in January 2000 and was first performed in Concertgebouw, Amsterdam on April 26, 2000, by the Asko ensemble under the conductor Oliver Knussen.  The piece is dedicated to Asko/Schönberg.

Composition
The Asko Concerto has a duration of roughly 12 minutes and is composed in a single movement.  Carter briefly described the piece in the score program notes, writing:

Instrumentation
The work is scored for a chamber orchestra comprising flute (doubling piccolo), oboe, clarinet, bass clarinet, bassoon, French horn, trumpet, trombone, one percussionist, harp, piano (doubling celesta), two violins, viola, cello, and double bass.

Reception
The Asko Concerto has been praised by music critics.  Anthony Tommasini of The New York Times wrote:
Andrew Clements of The Guardian similarly opined, "In the Asko Concerto [... Carter's] instrumental webs move into the spotlight in a series of interlinked short movements in which every proportion is perfect."  Arnold Whittall of Gramophone also lauded the piece, writing, "... Carter provides a typically resourceful 12-minute structure in which the 16-strong ensemble is variously subdivided to engage in a succession of trenchant dialogues and mercurial exchanges."

References

Concertos by Elliott Carter
2000 compositions
Concertos for orchestra
Compositions for chamber orchestra